Waisea Turaga is a Fijian international male lawn bowler.

Biography
Turaga won a triples bronze medal (with Arun Kumar and David Aitcheson) at the 2015 Asia Pacific Bowls Championships in New Zealand.

References

Living people
Fijian male bowls players
Year of birth missing (living people)